Robert "Kip" Wells (born April 21, 1977) is an American former professional baseball pitcher. In his Major League Baseball (MLB) career, he played for the Pittsburgh Pirates, Texas Rangers, St. Louis Cardinals, Colorado Rockies, Chicago White Sox, Kansas City Royals, Washington Nationals, Cincinnati Reds and San Diego Padres.

High school career
Wells attended Elkins High School in Missouri City, Texas and was a baseball star and an honor roll student. In baseball, he won All-State and All-America honors after his Senior year (1995).  He was drafted by the Milwaukee Brewers in the 58th round of the 1995 Major League Baseball Draft, but did not sign with the Brewers. Instead, he went to Baylor University.

College career
He posted a career record of 21-14 for the Baylor Bears with a 5.17 ERA and 288 strikeouts in three collegiate seasons and was  2nd Team All-America, 1998 Big 12 1st Team, 1998 All-Region,  Pre Season All America 2nd Team.

Pro career

Chicago White Sox
Wells was the first round (16th overall) draft pick of the Chicago White Sox in the 1998 Major League Baseball Draft. He made his first major league appearance with the White Sox the following year. In his debut against the Detroit Tigers, Wells went 5.1 innings, giving up 6 hits, 2 runs and 1 earned run while walking 2 and striking out 4 for his first Major League victory

Pittsburgh Pirates
After the  season, in which he split time between the starting rotation and the bullpen, Wells was traded to the Pittsburgh Pirates.

As of the end of the  season, Wells had a 55-69 record and a 4.36 ERA after 188 games over the course of seven seasons. Wells led the league in losses in 2005, going 8-18 on a Pirates team that went 67-95.

On March 1, Wells announced he would have surgery to remove a blood clot in his right arm.  The surgery was performed on March 6, and he returned to the field on June 19, 2006.

Texas Rangers
At the trade deadline in 2006, Wells was traded from the Pittsburgh Pirates to the Texas Rangers for Jesse Chavez.

St. Louis Cardinals

On November 28, 2006, Kip Wells signed a free agent contract with the St. Louis Cardinals. Kip Wells was said to be the Cardinals starting pitching rotation. He struggled in the first half, going 3-11 with an ERA of 5.92 and getting demoted to the bullpen right before the All-Star break. After the All-Star Break, he was a little better, posting a 4-6 record. He made a promising start against the Florida Marlins on July 18, when he threw eight shutout innings in a 6-0 Cardinals win. At the conclusion of the  season, Wells' record was 7-17 with an ERA of 5.70.

Colorado Rockies
On December 13, 2007, he signed with the Colorado Rockies. Slated to be a long reliever for the team, he wound up making the start for the Rockies on Opening Day.  Jeff Francis was supposed to get the start, but the Rockies' first game was rained out, and manager Clint Hurdle opted to start Wells to keep the rotation on normal rest. Wells began the  season compiling a 2.29 ERA in ten games with 16 strikeouts as the primary long relief pitcher out of the bullpen. However, on April 30, Wells was placed on the disabled list with blood clots in his pitching hand. On August 10, 2008, the Rockies designated him for assignment and was eventually released.

Kansas City Royals
Wells signed with the Kansas City Royals on August 18, 2008.

Washington Nationals
On March 11, Wells signed a minor league contract with the Washington Nationals. He was brought up to the majors to pitch out of the bullpen, but was ineffective, posting a 6.49 ERA in 26.1 innings before being placed on the disabled list with a right adductor strain on June 2. He was again designated for assignment on June 24.

Cincinnati Reds
On July 9, 2009, Wells signed a deal with Cincinnati Reds Triple A affiliate, the Louisville Bats.

In August Wells was promoted to the Reds once again pitching in major league baseball. The Reds used Wells in the role of a long reliever as well as a fill-in starter.

On February 13, 2010 the Cincinnati Reds re-signed Wells to a minor league deal with an invitation to spring training.

On April 2, 2010, Wells was released by the Reds.

Long Island Ducks
On July 14, 2010, he signed with the Long Island Ducks.

Arizona Diamondbacks
On March 24, 2011, Wells signed a minor league deal with the Arizona Diamondbacks. Wells never pitched an inning for the D'Backs AAA system.

Chicago White Sox
Wells hired Burton Rocks as his agent and on April 6, 2012, Wells agreed to a minor league deal with the Chicago White Sox but subsequently agreed to a mutual release on April 16, 2012.

San Diego Padres
On May 8, 2012, Wells agreed to a minor league contract with the San Diego Padres.
Wells had his contract purchased by the major league club on June 25, 2012. On June 26, Wells started his first major league game since 2009 against the Houston Astros. On August 3, 2012, the Padres designated Wells for assignment.  Wells accepted the assignment to Triple-A Tucson after clearing waivers.  Wells posted a 2-4 record and a 4.58 ERA in 7 starts for the Padres.  The highlight of his time with the Padres was his seven shutout innings in a start in Coors Field, but his 0.95 strikeout-to-walk ratio and 1.4 home runs per nine innings hurt his overall results.

Los Angeles Angels of Anaheim
On April 13, 2013, Wells agreed to a minor league deal with the Los Angeles Angels of Anaheim. Wells was released after six starts.

On November 10, 2013, Wells announced his retirement at the age of 36.

Coaching career

In 2016, he was named the pitching coach for the Rancho Cucamonga Quakes, the Los Angeles Dodgers Class-A affiliate in the California League. He left his position with the Dodgers organization after the 2017 season.

References

External links

Profile at CBS.Sportsline.com

1977 births
Living people
Baylor Bears baseball players
Chicago White Sox players
Pittsburgh Pirates players
Texas Rangers players
St. Louis Cardinals players
Colorado Rockies players
Kansas City Royals players
Cincinnati Reds players
Washington Nationals players
San Diego Padres players
Major League Baseball pitchers
Baseball players from Texas
Birmingham Barons players
Winston-Salem Warthogs players
Charlotte Knights players
Lynchburg Hillcats players
Altoona Curve players
Tulsa Drillers players
Colorado Springs Sky Sox players
Potomac Nationals players
Syracuse Chiefs players
Louisville Bats players
Long Island Ducks players
Tucson Padres players
Salt Lake Bees players
Minor league baseball coaches
Brewster Whitecaps players